Tarik Tnibar is a Moroccan footballer. He usually plays as forward.

Tnibar previously played for Chabab Mohammedia and signed a five-year contract with Raja in July 2009.

References

1986 births
Living people
Moroccan footballers
People from Mohammedia
Association football forwards
SCC Mohammédia players